Hudson's Bay, known colloquially and operating online as The Bay, is a Canadian luxury goods department store chain. It is the flagship brand of the Hudson's Bay Company (HBC), the oldest, largest and longest-surviving company in North America as well as one of the oldest and largest continuously operating companies in the world.

Founded on 2 May 1670, the Hudson's Bay Company opened its first department store in 1881 in Winnipeg, Manitoba. The chain operated under the company name before being rebranded to The Bay in 1965. It operated exclusively in Western Canada until the acquisitions and conversions of department stores Morgan's, Freimans, Simpsons, Woodward's, coupled with the opening of new locations, positioned its presence nationwide in the second half of the 20th century. After nearly 50 years with The Bay brand, the chain was rebranded in 2013 to Hudson's Bay with a modernized logo. In 2021, The Bay name (but not the logo) was revived exclusively for the online website while the physical stores continued with the Hudson's Bay brand.

, Hudson's Bay operates 86 locations in seven Canadian provinces. From 2017–2019, it operated in the Netherlands, in partnership with Austrian real estate company Signa Holding. The full-line department stores focus on high-end fashion apparel, accessories, and home goods; flagship stores carry a bigger range and selection of goods than typical locations. The flagship stores are often multi-story, historic buildings and are located in Canada's largest cities (Toronto, Montreal, Vancouver, Calgary, and Ottawa).

History

Early history

The diversification of the Hudson's Bay Company (HBC) became necessary with the decline of fur trade in the latter half of the 19th century, and the Deed of Surrender in which ownership of the North-Western Territory and Rupert's Land was transferred from HBC to the newly established country of Canada in 1870. The first Hudson's Bay Company store opened in 1881 in Winnipeg, Manitoba with an inventory consisting of dry goods, groceries, and hardware. HBC reorganized into fur trade, lands sales, and retail divisions in 1910; with the guidance of a director from the British department store Harrods, they began construction of full-line department stores in 1913. This "modernization program" resulted the "original six" department stores in Calgary and Edmonton in Alberta; Vancouver and Victoria in British Columbia; Winnipeg in Manitoba; and Saskatoon in Saskatchewan.

Hudson's Bay Company entered the provinces of Ontario and Quebec with its acquisition of the Montreal-based Morgan's department store chain in 1960; that year, only the Morgan's stores in Ontario were converted to Hudson's Bay Company stores.

Following renaming to The Bay

Hudson's Bay Company stores were renamed The Bay (which was already a popular nickname) in 1965, while the Morgan's stores in Quebec were renamed La Baie in 1972. That same year, Hudson's Bay purchased Ottawa's Freimans department store and moved from the former Morgan's building on Sparks Street to the Freiman building on Rideau Street, closer to competing Ogilvy's and Caplan's.

The Bay further expanded its presence in Eastern Canada by absorbing the Simpsons department store chain in 1978 and 1993 in Western Canada by taking over many former Woodward's outlets. The Toronto Queen Street flagship store was previously a Simpsons department store. In 1991, Hudson's Bay Company stopped selling fur. In 1997 the company reopened its fur salons, including a wider assortment of high-end designer furs. Fur salons included many exclusive fur designers, including Louis Féraud, Givenchy, Black Diamond Mink, and Grosvenor.

On 16 July 2008, it was announced that Hudson's Bay Company had been purchased by the US firm NRDC Equity Partners, which owned Lord & Taylor.

In August 2008, Bonnie Brooks was hired as president and chief executive officer of the Hudson's Bay Company. As the result of market research, Brooks began to focus on bolstering high-end fashion as a growth segment. These moves included a major revamp of the chain's selection of labels, and a renovation and relaunch of The Room—a luxury women's department at the Queen Street location. During the 2010 Winter Olympics in Vancouver, a heritage-oriented campaign was used to promote The Bay and an accompanying line of Olympic-themed apparel, which was considered to be a significant success. In 2010, the Queen Street location saw a 22% increase in year-over-year sales. In 2011, The Bay launched White Space—a new younger-skewing "contemporary" department—at selected locations.

Following renaming to Hudson's Bay

Hudson's Bay Company announced alongside its initial public offering that The Bay stores would be renamed to Hudson's Bay beginning in October 2012; replacing the stylized yellow "B" used since 1965 with the Hudson's Bay wordmark and coat of arms. The new Hudson's Bay rebranding campaign was officially launched on 6 March 2013.

On 31 August 2019, the company announced that all 15 of its Dutch locations would be sold by year end, the final chapter of HBC's European venture.

Hudson's Bay stores were temporarily closed beginning on 17 March 2020 in response to the COVID-19 pandemic in Canada. The stores began gradually reopening on 19 May.

In August 2021, HBC split the online business of Hudson's Bay into its own separate division. The online portion is now officially called The Bay, while the physical stores retained the Hudson's Bay name.

Flagship stores
Hudson's Bay operates five flagship stores in four provinces. These flagship stores are in multi-storey historic buildings in the downtowns of Canada's largest cities. The largest, the Toronto store building on the southwest corner of Yonge Street and Queen Street West, was converted from Simpsons in 1991. Considered the flagship of the chain, it currently occupies , while a fifth of previously-occupied space was converted to the Canadian Saks Fifth Avenue flagship store in 2015. Hudson's Bay Company sold the building to Cadillac Fairview, which owns the adjacent Toronto Eaton Centre, in 2014 and entered into a leaseback agreement through at least 2039. Conversely, the Ottawa store on Rideau Street occupies  and is the smallest flagship that remains in a landmark building; it was converted from Freimans in 1973.

Hudson's Bay formerly operated a store in the Hudson's Bay Centre, at the intersection of Yonge Street and Bloor Street at the east end of the Mink Mile in Toronto, opened in 1974 and succeeded the Winnipeg location to become the flagship store of the chain (despite being actually smaller in size than the former), and then was replaced as the chain's flagship by the Queen Street West store in 1991. The Hudson's Bay Centre store shuttered on 13 May 2022, with the site expected to be redeveloped in conjunction with a major overhaul of the Bloor-Yonge TTC station.

Hudson's Bay operated flagship stores in Victoria, Edmonton (see below), Regina and Saskatoon but vacated these locations in 1999, in favor of spaces in major downtown shopping centres that were left vacant by the bankruptcy of rival department store chain Eaton's that year. After the exit of Hudson's Bay, these former flagship locations have been repurposed for other tenants. Recently in October 2020, due to changing shopping habits towards online purchasing as a result of the COVID-19 pandemic, the parent of Hudson's Bay has considered downsizing some stores and redeveloping the surplus space for mixed-use.

Two flagship stores in the Canadian Prairies were announced to be phased out in the aftermath of the COVID-19 pandemic in Canada. The 1926-built downtown Winnipeg store on Portage Avenue was the flagship of the chain between 1926 and 1974. The Winnipeg building was valued at $0 by Cushman & Wakefield in 2019, due to the expense of renovating the heritage-protected building for other uses, as well as the competition from newer commercial real estate properties in the suburbs like Polo Park. The downtown Edmonton store on Jasper Avenue was built in 1939 on land that had been occupied by Hudson's Bay Company since 1893. It closed in 1995, two years after another The Bay store opened as an anchor tenant of the Edmonton City Centre. The latter eventually relocated to the former Eaton's store of the same shopping mall in 2002. The Winnipeg store was phased out on 30 November 2020, and the Edmonton store was phased out on 3 June 2021.

HBC stated that it was exploring the option of a leaseback agreement for the 1927-built Vancouver store in 2017, which has yet to materialize.

Store format

The Room and West End Shop
The Room is a luxury boutique found in selected Hudson's Bay locations, which features a curated selection of women's apparel from upscale brands such as Balmain, Emmanuel Ungaro, Halston, Gianfranco Ferre, Giorgio Armani, Moschino, and others. Nicholas Mellamphy is the vice-president and buying director of The Room. Its namesake at the Yonge & Queen location in Toronto was established in the 1930s as the St. Regis Room, dating back to its time as a Simpsons store. The $5.3 million renovation was positioned by Brooks as part of a plan to increase The Bay's focus on high-end fashion; there were also plans to expand The Room as a featured department at other flagship locations.

The Room opened at the downtown Vancouver location in 2011, in the north-east section of the second floor. The  department includes many of the designers available in the Toronto Queen Street flagship store, and some not available in the flagship store, including DSquared², Jeremy Liang, and Sid Neigum. The Room opened in the downtown Montreal Hudson's Bay store in late 2013. The Toronto version of The Room was relocated to a different part of the store in 2015 to accommodate a new Saks Fifth Avenue location.

The West End Shop is the men's version of The Room. The Toronto Queen Street and the Vancouver Granville West End Shops recently underwent an extensive renovation. The current collection contains labels such as Hugo Boss, Ermenegildo Zegna, Armani Collezioni, Ben Sherman, and Strellson.

Hudson's Bay Company Signature Shop
The Bay offers products from the Hudson's Bay Company Collection in a dedicated store, including items such as the iconic Point Blankets, coats, bed sheets, bags, T-shirts, lotions, scents, and candles. HBC has also partnered with Canadian companies like Virginia Johnson, Pink Tartan, and Klaxon Howl to create exclusive, limited edition merchandise. Customized canoes and oars are also available. HBC has also teamed up with international companies for limited edition products, such as Steiff (heritage teddy bear, limited run of 2 500), and Best Made Axe Co. While the Hudson's Bay Company shops appear mainly in flagship stores and its Banff, Alberta location, products from the Hudson's Bay Company Collection (not including limited edition items) are also available at other locations, most notably the Point Blanket. The four-point stripes have also been trademarked worldwide, and are planned to be sold through international retailers which including Lord & Taylor in the US, and Colette in France, in an attempt to market HBC as a brand.

Designer label boutiques
Boutiques for Ralph Lauren are in select locations, including Queen Street, Yorkdale, Bayshore Ottawa, Carrefour Laval, Galeries d'Anjou, Vancouver Downtown, Victoria Downtown, Laurier Québec, and Montreal Downtown. Each boutique contains customized decor, and dedicated company specialists.

The Toronto Queen Street and Montreal Downtown store has opened ground floor boutiques for Burberry, Coach Leathergoods, and See by Chloé. Vancouver and Montreal ground-floor designer boutiques will follow. Hudson's Bay has ended its partnership with Saint-Laurent-based Browns Shoes, and closed all Browns locations in its stores, to allow the department store to offer a larger selection of shoes, and to partner with the Montreal-based ALDO Group. Hudson's Bay is now also offering higher-end brands, keeping in line with offerings from The Room and the West End Shop. The partnership with the Aldo Group began in spring 2011 when the revived Pegabo brand of footwear is going to be carried in Hudson's Bay and in Aldo's own FeetFirst and Locale locations. The website includes online shopping for home fashions and beauty products, and a gift registry.

Brand identity

Logo
The Hudson's Bay Company wordmark was written in Blackletter script before 1965.

Lippincott & Margulies designed the "folk-friendly" 1965 The Bay logo, which features a stylized yellow "B" that was previously seen on the header of Hudson Bay Company's royal charter from 1670. Morgan's stores in Quebec featured a logo with an "M" stylized similarly to the "B" from 1969 until they were rebranded to La Baie in 1972. 

Lipman designed the 2013 Hudson's Bay rebranding campaign; it restores the Hudson's Bay Company coat of arms, redrawn by Mark Summers. The wordmark is used on all public-facing materials, and has been compared to the typeface used by British fashion house Burberry. The coat of arms is reserved for limited occasions. Before the official rebranding launch, the logo appeared on the exterior of the Vancouver flagship store in December 2012.

See also

HBC Rewards
List of Canadian department stores

References

External links

The Bay Formerly the website of Hudson's Bay. Now a separate division of HBC.

Companies based in Toronto
Department stores of Canada
Hudson's Bay Company
Retail companies established in 1670